The 2022 Women's Hockey East Association tournament was played between February 23 and March 8. The opening round, quarterfinals and semifinals were played on campus locations. The championship was hosted by the highest remaining seed, Northeastern. Northeastern defeated Connecticut 3-1 to earn their 5th straight tournament championship. They also earned the conference's automatic bid into the 2022 NCAA National Collegiate Women's Ice Hockey Tournament.

Standings

Bracket 

Note: * denotes overtime period(s)

References 

College sports in Massachusetts
Ice hockey in Boston
Hockey East Women's Ice Hockey Tournament
Hockey East Women's Ice Hockey Tournament
Hockey East Women's Ice Hockey Tournament
Hockey East Women's Ice Hockey Tournament